Daniel Lee Gallagher (born 20 June 1997) is an English professional footballer who plays as a midfielder for Dorking Wanderers.

Club career
Having played for AFC Wimbledon since age ten, Gallagher made his Football league début for AFC Wimbledon on 14 April 2015, coming on as a late substitute during the 1–1 away draw with Plymouth Argyle. Gallagher signed his first professional contract with AFC Wimbledon in February 2015.

On 4 August 2016, Gallagher joined Isthmian League side and neighbours, Kingstonian on a one-month loan. Just under a week later, he made his debut during a 1–0 defeat to Harlow Town, playing the full 90 minutes. On 1 September 2016, his loan was extended for a further month. During this following month, Gallagher went onto feature four more times before returning to Wimbledon in October.

Following his release from Wimbledon, Gallagher opted to return to the Isthmian League, to join Leatherhead in July 2017. Gallagher joined Leatherhead's neighbours Dorking Wanderers in August 2019.

Personal life
Dan is the younger brother of twins; Jake and Josh, who both respectively play for Maidstone United and Raynes Park Vale and the older brother of Chelsea footballer and England international, Conor.

Career statistics

References

External links

Living people
1997 births
Sportspeople from Epsom
English footballers
Footballers from Surrey
Association football midfielders
English Football League players
Isthmian League players
National League (English football) players
AFC Wimbledon players
Kingstonian F.C. players
Leatherhead F.C. players
Dorking Wanderers F.C. players